Prairie Madness is a guitar/piano duo that existed in the 1960s and 70s in Los Angeles and Marin County, California. It was composed of Chris Ducey and Ed Millis. Their self-titled album and its single, 'Shame The Children' were co-produced by Matthew Fisher, Procol Harum organist, and Joel Sill.

Personnel
 Chris Ducey - Acoustic and Electric guitars
 Ed Millis - Piano and Accordion
 Jack Conrad - Bass Guitar
 Richie Hayward - Drums
 Jim Young - Drums
 Matthew Fisher - Organ, Harpsichord
 Ralph Bryan - Electric Guitar
 Emil Richards - Assorted African Percussion
 Airto Moreira - Assorted Brazilian Percussion
 Richard Davis - Upright Bass

See also
 Matthew Fisher
 Procol Harum
 Columbia Records

References

External links
 Prairie Madness page on a Procol Harum fan site
 Follow-up History
 Penny Arkade - 8th paragraph from bottom

Folk rock groups from California
American musical duos
Folk music duos
Rock music duos
Columbia Records artists